Boris Zaytsev may refer to:
Boris Zaytsev (writer) (1881–1972), Russian writer and dramatist
Boris Mikhaylovich Zaytsev (1937–2000), Russian ice hockey player

See also
Zaytsev